Neil Thomas O'Reilly (26 July 1925 – 26 October 1985) was an Australian rules footballer who played with Fitzroy in the Victorian Football League (VFL).

Notes

External links 

1925 births
1985 deaths
Australian rules footballers from Melbourne
Fitzroy Football Club players